Kujtim Shala (born 13 July 1964) is a Croatian-Albanian former professional footballer who played as a midfielder.

International career
Shala made one appearance for the Croatia national team in a 2–1 win against the United States on 17 October 1990, during a friendly match before the Croatian Football Federation was affiliated by FIFA in 1992.

Coaching career
Shala was the head coach of FC Prishtina in Kosovar Superliga. But after FC Prishtina failed to win the Kosovar Superliga, he was sacked.

In February 2008 he was selected as head coach of the Kosovo national football team.

Personal life
Shala was born in Prizren, SFR Yugoslavia (now Kosovo) and is of Albanian descent. His son is fellow footballer Andis Shala.

References

External links

1964 births
Living people
Sportspeople from Prizren
Kosovo Albanians
Croatian people of Albanian descent
Croatian people of Kosovan descent
Kosovan emigrants to Croatia
Association football midfielders
Yugoslav footballers
Croatian footballers
Croatia international footballers
Kosovan footballers
KF Liria players
FK Partizan players
FC Prishtina players
GNK Dinamo Zagreb players
Stade Rennais F.C. players
Stuttgarter Kickers players
Chemnitzer FC players
Fortuna Düsseldorf players
1. FC Lokomotive Leipzig players
VfR Mannheim players
Yugoslav First League players
Ligue 1 players
Bundesliga players
2. Bundesliga players
Kosovan expatriate footballers
Croatian expatriate footballers
Expatriate footballers in Germany
Kosovan expatriate sportspeople in Germany
Croatian expatriate sportspeople in Germany
Expatriate footballers in France
Kosovan expatriate sportspeople in France
Croatian expatriate sportspeople in France
Croatian football managers
Kosovan football managers
FC Prishtina managers
Kosovo national football team managers
Government ministers of Kosovo
Shala (tribe)